William Hedgcock Webster (born March 6, 1924) is an American attorney and jurist who most recently served as chair of the Homeland Security Advisory Council from 2005 until 2020. He was a United States district judge of the United States District Court for the Eastern District of Missouri and a United States circuit judge of the United States Court of Appeals for the Eighth Circuit before becoming director of the Federal Bureau of Investigation (FBI) from 1978 to 1987 and director of Central Intelligence (CIA) from 1987 to 1991. He is the only person to have held both positions.

Education and career

Early life
Webster was born in St. Louis, Missouri, and received his early education in Webster Groves, Missouri; and served as a lieutenant in the United States Navy during World War II.  Following his service in the Navy, he received his Bachelor of Arts degree from Amherst College, Amherst, Massachusetts, in 1947. While at Amherst, he was a member of the Psi Upsilon fraternity. He received his  from the Washington University School of Law in St. Louis in 1949. After law school, he served in the Navy again during the Korean War; later, he joined the St. Louis law firm Armstrong Teasdale, but left private practice soon after to begin a career in public service. He was the United States Attorney for the Eastern District of Missouri from 1960 to 1961, then a member of the Missouri Board of Law Examiners from 1964 to 1969.

Federal judicial service
Webster was nominated by President Richard Nixon on December 8, 1970, to the United States District Court for the Eastern District of Missouri, to a new seat created by 84 Stat. 294. He was confirmed by the United States Senate on December 17, 1970, and received his commission on December 21, 1970. His service was terminated on August 10, 1973, due to elevation to the Eighth Circuit.

Webster was nominated by President Nixon on June 13, 1973, to a seat on the United States Court of Appeals for the Eighth Circuit vacated by Judge Marion Charles Matthes. He was confirmed by the Senate on July 13, 1973, and received his commission on July 18, 1973. His service was terminated on February 22, 1978, due to his resignation.

Director of the Federal Bureau of Investigation (1978–1987)
In 1978, President Jimmy Carter appointed him as director of the Federal Bureau of Investigation. This was despite Webster being a registered Republican.

Webster was portrayed by actor Sean Cullen in Season 2 of the Netflix show Mindhunter, which took place during his tenure as director of the FBI.

Director of Central Intelligence (1987–1991)
In 1987, President Ronald Reagan chose him to be director of the Central Intelligence Agency. He led the CIA until his retirement from public office in 1991. Since then, Webster has practiced law at the Washington, D.C., office of Milbank, Tweed, Hadley & McCloy, where he specializes in arbitration, mediation and internal investigation.

Public Company Accounting Oversight Board
In 2002, he was the first chairman of the Public Company Accounting Oversight Board (PCAOB). However, his appointment was controversial, and another controversy erupted when newspapers reported that Webster had headed the board audit committee of U.S. Technologies, a high-tech company being investigated for accounting irregularities and accused of fraud. Webster resigned less than three weeks after the PCAOB was set up.

Webster was the longtime chairman of the Homeland Security Advisory Council,  from 2005 to 2020.

In 2020, Webster, along with over 130 other former Republican national security officials, signed a statement that asserted that President Trump was unfit to serve another term, and "To that end, we are firmly convinced that it is in the best interest of our nation that Vice President Joe Biden be elected as the next President of the United States, and we will vote for him."

Honors and awards
Webster received numerous honors and awards for his service. Washington University granted him the Alumni Citation for contributions to the field of law in 1972 and in 1981 he received the William Greenleaf Eliot Award. In 1984, he received the U.S. Senator John Heinz Award for Greatest Public Service by an Elected or Appointed Official, an award given out annually by Jefferson Awards. In 1999 the School of Law created the Webster Society, an outstanding scholars program. Furthermore, he received the Distinguished Alumnus Award from the university's law school in 1977. The St. Louis Globe-Democrat named him "Man of the Year". In 1978, he received the Golden Plate Award of the American Academy of Achievement.

Webster also received honorary degrees from several colleges and universities. In 1991, he was presented the Distinguished Intelligence Medal, the Presidential Medal of Freedom, and the National Security Medal. In June 2008 Webster received an honorary Doctor of Laws degree as well as honorary doctorates from The Institute of World Politics and National Intelligence University. He received the William J. Donovan Award from The OSS Society in 2005 and serves as an honorary chairman of this organization.

Webster is a member of the American Bar Association, the Council of the American Law Institute, the Order of the Coif, The Missouri Bar, the Bar Association of Metropolitan St. Louis and the Psi Upsilon fraternity. Additionally, he served as chairman of the Corporation, Banking and Business Law Section of the American Bar Association. He is a fellow of the American Bar Foundation and an Honorary Fellow of the American College of Trial Lawyers. He served as co-chairman of the Homeland Security Advisory Council. In 2009, he was named to head an independent investigation of the FBI's actions surrounding the Fort Hood shooting.

Webster also serves as an honorary director on the board of directors at the Atlantic Council.

Personal life
He was married for 34 years to Drusilla Lane until her death in 1984 and the couple had three children: Drusilla L. Busch, William H. Webster Jr. and Katherine H. Roessle.

In 1990, he married Lynda Clugston. They reside in Washington, D.C. In 2015, William and Lynda Webster were targeted by a man who peddled a lottery scam over phone calls and emails. Over multiple phone calls, Keniel Aeon Thomas of Jamaica told the Websters he'd set their house ablaze or have a sniper shoot them in the back of the head if they didn't pay him thousands of dollars, according to prosecutors' filings. The Websters used their friendship with people at the FBI to help send the scammer to prison for nearly six years in early 2019.

Quotes 
On March 3, 2002, the University of California, Santa Barbara, held a debate titled "National Security vs. Personal Liberty". The guest speakers were Webster and American Civil Liberties Union President Nadine Strossen. During the debate, Webster made the following statement, which has since gained some popularity: "Security is always seen as too much until the day it is not enough." He also stated: "Order protects liberty and liberty protects order."

References

External links
 
 Chairman, Homeland Security Advisory Council
 'Speakers Debate How to Mix Freedom, Safety', The Daily Nexus; UC, Santa Barbara; Published March 4, 2002
 
  Institute of World Politics
 

1924 births
20th-century American judges
American Christian Scientists
Amherst College alumni
Atlantic Council 
Directors of the Central Intelligence Agency
Directors of the Federal Bureau of Investigation
Judges of the United States Court of Appeals for the Eighth Circuit
Judges of the United States District Court for the Eastern District of Missouri
Lawyers from St. Louis
Lawyers from Washington, D.C.
Living people
Members of the American Law Institute 
Military personnel from St. Louis
People associated with Milbank, Tweed, Hadley & McCloy
People from Webster Groves, Missouri
Presidential Medal of Freedom recipients
Reagan administration cabinet members
Recipients of the Distinguished Intelligence Medal
United States Attorneys for the Eastern District of Missouri
United States Department of Homeland Security officials
United States Navy officers
United States court of appeals judges appointed by Richard Nixon
United States district court judges appointed by Richard Nixon
Washington University School of Law alumni
Washington, D.C., Republicans
United States Navy personnel of World War II
Psi Upsilon